Dunderklumpen! is a 1974 Swedish family film directed by Per Åhlin, which combines animation and live action. The story involves several musical numbers. It was released on 26 September 1974. At the 11th Guldbagge Awards, Åhlin won a Special Achievement award for the film.

Plot
On a summer evening in northern Sweden, when the sun doesn't quite set, Dunderklumpen (an animated character) comes out of the woods to seek some friends to keep him company. He comes upon a "human" house of the Wolgers family where Dunderklumpen finds toys belonging to a boy named Jens and his young sister.  Using his magic, Dunderklumpen brings the toys to life and takes them away to the woods where he lives. This adorable and amusing crew includes the small but fiercely brave lion Lionel, the demanding toy girl Doll, the cute harmonica-playing bear Pellegnillot, and the ridiculous Dummy the Bunny.

But Jens hears and sees the toys crying for help and follows Dunderklumpen who is not so quick to surrender his new-found company. They are also followed by Jens' Father who goes searching for his run-away son and is accompanied by the dutiful Bumblebee. Dunderklumpen also has a small locked chest (that he took from the children's room) with him and believes it contains a great treasure. One-Eye, an old nemesis of Dunderklumpen, also seeks the treasure for himself and pursues our heroes. No one knows what the contents are but Dunderklumpen and One-Eye are both sure it's priceless. One-Eye's signature tool is a small counterfeiting machine he uses to beguile the toys and Dunderklumpen.

Following Dunderklumpen into the woods, Jens meets a flower which name is Blossom, who travels on an umbrella and helps him along the way. The gang also meets the flying paper Malte (one of Jens drawings come to life), the living-talking mountain Jorm, and an elderly woman name Elvira Fattigan who's an old friend of One-Eye.

In the end Elvira reminds One-Eye of his fall from grace came after encountering human materialism and soon the chest reveals to contain a feather, a dandelion and a rock that are considered treasures to a child. Realizing the chest had no valuables but cherished treasures, everyone celebrates in song and dance, One-Eye becomes friends with Dunderklumpen, the toys stay behind with the both of them and Jens and his Father return home together.

Cast
Beppe Wolgers – The Father
Jens Wolgers – Jens
Halvar Björk – Dunderklumpen/Jätten (Jorm) 
Håkan Serner – Lejonel  (Lionel)
Gösta Ekman – En-Dum-En (Dummy)
Toots Thielemans – Pellegnillot 
Lotten Strömstedt – Dockan (Doll)
Sif Ruud – Elvira Fattigan  
Birgitta Andersson – Blomhåret (Blossom)
Hans Alfredson – Humlan (Bumblebee)
Stig Grybe – Enöga (One-Eye)
Bert-Åke Varg – Huset som pratar (Old House)
Beppe Wolgers – Vattenfallet (Waterfall)

References

External links

1974 films
1974 musical films
Films directed by Per Åhlin
Musical fantasy films
Swedish animated films
Swedish fantasy films
Swedish children's films
1970s Swedish-language films
Swedish musical films
1974 animated films
1970s children's fantasy films
Films set in Sweden
1970s Swedish films